Bad Genius: The Series is a 2020 Thai television series starring Plearnpichaya Komalarajun (Juné), Jinjett Wattanasin (Jaonaay), Sawanya Paisarnpayak (Nana) and Paris Intarakomalyasut (Ice). An adaptation of the film with the same title, the series consists of a new cast and crew directed by Pat Boonnitipat under GDH 559.

It premiered on One31 and WeTV on 3 August 2020, airing on Mondays and Tuesdays at 20:15 ICT and 23:00 ICT, respectively. The series concluded on 8 September 2020.

Cast and characters 
Below are the cast of the series:

Main 
 Plearnpichaya Komalarajun (Juné) as Lynn
 Jinjett Wattanasin (Jaonaay) as Bank
 Sawanya Paisarnpayak (Nana) as Grace
 Paris Intarakomalyasut (Ice) as Pat

Supporting 
 Saksit Tangthong (Tang) as Vit (Lynn's father)
 Apasiri Nitibhon (Um) as Headmistress Pornthip
 Ruengrit McIntosh (Willy) as Ake (Pat's father)
  (Organ) as Wan (Lynn's mother)
  as Bank's mother
  as Music
 Tonhon Tantivejakul (Ton) as Ping
  (Junior) as Third
 Sadanon Durongkaveroj (Nont) as Tong
  (Big) as Mr. Sophon
 Claudine Craig as Claire
 Lawrence de Stefano as Mr. X

Guest role 
 Awat Ratanapintha (Ud) (Ep. 12)

Production 
The series was first bared during Tencent's launch of WeTV in Thailand in 2018. While the original film focused on efforts of the lead characters to cheat on the national exams, the series meanwhile delves into their lives. Pat Boonnitipat, who also directed GDH 559's Project S: The Series – SOS, was tasked to be the series' director along with a new set of lead characters and crew. He was at first "hesitant to take on the project" but later accepted it as a way to improve his skills as a filmmaker.

Among the lead characters, only Jinjett Wattanasin did not have any serious acting background. Plearnpichaya Komalarajun was previously a part of the series One Year 365 (2019) while Paris Intarakomalyasut and Sawanya Paisarnpayak had roles for In Family We Trust (2018). To get a perspective from different generations with regards to the action of the lead characters, Boonnitipat also included veteran actors and actress such as Apasiri Nitibhon, Willie McIntosh and Saksit Tangthong.

Awards and nominations

References

External links 
 Bad Genius: The Series on One31 website 
 Bad Genius: The Series on GDH 559 website 
 Bad Genius: The Series on WeTV
 

One 31 original programming
Thai drama television series
2020 Thai television series debuts
2020 Thai television series endings
Television series by GDH 559